The Committee for Medicinal Products for Human Use (CHMP), formerly known as Committee for Proprietary Medicinal Products (CPMP), is the European Medicines Agency's committee responsible for elaborating the agency's opinions on all issues regarding medicinal products for human use.

See also 
 Committee for Medicinal Products for Veterinary Use

References

External links 
 Committee for Medicinal Products for Human Use (CHMP)
 European Medicines Agency - Committee for Medicinal Products for Human Use (CHMP)

Health and the European Union